Eukaryotic translation initiation factor 4E-binding protein 3 is a protein that in humans is encoded by the EIF4EBP3 gene.

Function 

This gene encodes a member of the EIF4EBP family which derives its name from proteins that bind to eukaryotic initiation factor 4E and that prevent its assembly into EIF4F. Co-transcription of this gene and the neighboring upstream gene (MASK) generates a transcript (MASK-BP3) which encodes a fusion protein composed of the MASK protein sequence for the majority of the protein and a different C-terminus due to an alternate reading frame for the EIF4EBP3 segments.

Interactions 

EIF4EBP3 has been shown to interact with EIF4E.

References

Further reading